Niespotykanie spokojny człowiek (Pol. Incredibly peaceful man) is a Polish television film from 1975 directed by Stanisław Bareja.

Cast 
 Janusz Kłosiński - Stanislaw Wlodek
 Ryszarda Hanin - Aniela Wlodek
 Malgorzata Potocka - Helenka
 Janina Sokolowska - Ula
 Marek Frąckowiak - Tadek Wlodek
 Jerzy Turek - Truck Driver
 Stanisław Tym - Capt. Tadeusz Zwozniak
 Ludwik Benoit - Guard

References

External links 

1975 films
Polish television films
Films directed by Stanisław Bareja
1970s Polish-language films
1975 comedy films
Polish comedy films